The MSU Faculty of Journalism is a faculty of the Moscow State University. It is situated on the Mohovaya, 9, in downtown [Moscow, approximately one block away from the Kremlin.

The dean of the MSU Faculty of Journalism is professor Elena Leonidovna Vartanova. The president is professor Yassen Nikolayevich Zassoursky. Zassoursky was the dean of the Faculty of Journalism since 1965 till 2007.

In 1952 it was reorganised as the independent Faculty of Journalism. About 15,000 mass media specialists who work in different editorial boards, television and radio stations, news agencies in Russia and abroad have been educated at the Faculty. More than 600 foreign students from Europe, Asia, Africa and America have graduated from the Faculty of Journalism.

Academic departments 
 Periodical Press (Head: Professor Michail Shkondin)
 Radio and Television (Head: Associate Professor Anna Kachkaeva)
 Media Theory and Economics (Head: Professor Elena Vartanova)
 Mass Media Techniques (Head: Associate Professor Stanislav Galkin)
 Sociology of Journalism (Head: Professor Evgeniy Prokhorov)
 Advertising and Public Relations (Head: Professor Vladimir Gorokhov)
 Editing, Publishing and Informatics (Head: Associate Professor Marina Alekseeva)
 History of Russian Journalism and Literature (Head: Professor Boris Esin)
 History of Modern Russian Mass Media and Media Law (Head: Professor Andrei Richter)
 History of Foreign Journalism and Literature (Head: Professor Yassen Zassoursky)
 Literary Criticism and Opinion journalism (Head: Professor Nickolay Bogomolov)
 Russian Language Stylistics (Head: Professor Grigoriy Solganik)
 New Media and Theory of Communication (Head: Associate Professor Ivan Zassoursky)
 UNESCO Chair of Journalism and Mass Communication (Head: Professor Yassen Zassoursky)

Departments, Centres and Labs 
Radio and TV Centre
Convergence Lab 
Department for Media Practice 
International Department 
French College of Journalism 
Free Russian-German Institute of Publicists 
Centre for Studies of Media Systems in Finland and Scandinavia
Russian-Italian Centre For Studies of Media, Culture and Communication
Russian-Japanese Centre for Studies of Media and Culture
Centre For Studies of Ibero-American Journalism and Culture
Russian-Indian Centre For Studies of Media and Culture

See also
Journalism school

External links 

MSU Faculty of Journalism (in English)
MSU Faculty of Journalism (in Russian)
MSU Faculty of Journalism - Students’ website (in Russian)
MSU Faculty of Journalism on Facebook (in Russian)
MSU Faculty of Journalism on Twitter (in Russian)

Journalism, Faculty of
Education in Moscow
Journalism schools in Europe
Arbat District
Russian journalism organizations